Novoaksaysky is a rural locality (a khutor) and the administrative center of Novoaksayskoye Rural Settlement, Oktyabrsky District, Volgograd Oblast, Russia. The population was 742 as of 2010. There are 9 streets.

Geography 
Novoaksaysky is located in steppe, on Yergeni, on the right bank of the Aksay River, 35 km west of Oktyabrsky (the district's administrative centre) by road. Generalovsky is the nearest rural locality.

References 

Rural localities in Oktyabrsky District, Volgograd Oblast